The Kaneang are an indigenous Noongar people of the south west region of Western Australia.

Country
On the Upper Blackwood River. The eastern boundary was formed by the line that runs from Katanning, Tambellup, Cranbrook, and Tenterden. Kaneang lands took in Kojonup, Qualeup, Donnybrook, Greenbushes and Bridgetown. They camped around the headwaters of both the Warren and Frankland rivers and along the southern bank of the Collie River as far as Collie.

Alternative names
 Kunjung/Kunyung (Koreng exonym)
 Kadbaranggara (Wiilman exonym from ka:la, "fire")
 Jabururu (Menang word meaning "northerners")
 Yobberore
 Uduc-Harvey tribe
 Kaleap (toponym)
 Qualeup, Qualup, Quailup
 Waal

Some words

  (farther)
  (mother)
  (kangaroo)
  (emu)
  (tame dog)
  (wild dog)
  (white man)
  (children)
  (good)
  (bad)

Notes

Citations

Sources

Great Southern (Western Australia)
Noongar